Reggie McBride (born September 17, 1954) is an American bass player.

Biography
McBride was born and raised in Detroit, Michigan, United States; listening to Motown records, he began to play bass at the age of 8. At the age of 14, he played in local bands and by that time, he was a sought after session musician, soon to be on the road with The Dramatics, opening for James Brown. In 1973 he was called by Stevie Wonder to join his band Wonderlove, followed by recording the album Fulfillingness' First Finale in 1974.

Since then he has played, recorded or toured with some of the biggest names in music history, such as Elton John, Rod Stewart, Billy Ray Cyrus, Tom Jones, Van Morrison, Eric Burdon, Rick Springfield, Lyle Lovett, Ziggy Marley, Rickie Lee Jones, Ry Cooder, Keb' Mo', Cher, Queen Latifah, jazz greats Herbie Hancock, Al Jarreau, blues greats John Lee Hooker, B.B. King and was a constant member of Tommy Bolin Band, Rare Earth, Glenn Frey and recently Steven Seagal.

In 2005, he released his first solo record, Element.

Discography
 1971 – Lazarus – Lazarus
 1974 – Syreeta Wright – Stevie Wonder Presents: Syreeta
 1974 – Minnie Riperton – Perfect Angel
 1974 – Tonto – It's About Time
 1974 – Stevie Wonder – Fulfillingness' First Finale
 1975 – Funkadelic – Let's Take It to the Stage
 1975 – Rare Earth – Back To Earth
 1975 – Billy Preston – It's My Pleasure
 1975 – Christopher Rainbow – Home of the Brave
 1976 – Tommy Bolin – Private Eyes
 1976 – Rare Earth – Midnight Lady
 1976 – Phoebe Snow – It Looks Like Snow
 1977 – Roderick Falconer – Victory in Rock City
 1977 – Toni & Terry – The Joy
 1977 – Robbie Krieger – Robby Krieger & Friends
 1977 – Nacy Shanx – Nancy Shanx
 1977 – Steve Hillage – Motivation Radio
 1977 – Michael Quatro – Gettin' Ready
 1977 – Danny O'Keefe – American Roulette
 1977 – Van Morrison – A Period of Transition
 1978 – John Palumbo – Innocent Bystander
 1978 – Paul Cacia & Janine Cameo – Unbelievable
 1978 – Brian Cadd – Yesterdaydreams
 1978 – Steve Harley – Hobo with a Grin
 1978 – Rare Earth – Grand Slam
 1978 – Al Jarreau – All Fly Home
 1979 – Taka Boom – Taka Boom
 1979 – Evie Sands – Suspended Animation
 1979 – Energetics – Come Down To Earth
 1979 – Bill LaBounty – Rain in My Life
 1979 – Tim Weisberg – Night Rider
 1979 – Ry Cooder – Bop Till You Drop
 1980 – Ry Cooder – The Long Riders
 1980 – Tom Jones – Rescue Me
 1980 – Ry Cooder – Borderline
 1980 – Syreeta Wright – Syreeta
 1980 – Elton John – 21 at 33
 1980 – Thelma Houston – Breakwater Cat
 1981 – Billy Preston – The Way I Am
 1981 – Elton John – The Fox
 1981 – David Lindley – El Rayo-X
 1981 – Patty Brard – All This Way
 1981 – Larry John McNally – Larry John McNally
 1982 – Patty Brard – You're in the Pocket
 1982 – Ry Cooder – The Slide Area
 1982 – Stevie Wonder – Original Musiquarium I
 1983 – Rickie Lee Jones – Girl at Her Volcano
 1983 – Matthew Wilder – I Don't Speak the Language
 1984 – Tina Turner – Private Dancer
 1984 – Rick Springfield – Hard to Hold
 1984 – Matthew Wilder – Bouncin' Off The Walls
 1985 – Joe Lamont – Secret You Hold
 1985 – Johnny Gill – Chemistry
 1985 – Robert Forman – Cat Juggling
 1986 – Larry John McNally – Fade To Black
 1987 – Wilson Pickett – American Soul Man
 1987 – Julie Brown – Trapped in the Body of a White Girl
 1987 – Marc Jordan – Talking Through Pictures
 1987 – Jessie Allen Cooper – Soft Wave
 1987 – Dan Hill – Dan Hill
 1988 – Michel Jonasz – La Fabuleuse Histoire De Mister Swing
 1988 – Jacques Haurogne – Amour Potentiel
 1990 – Bobby King – Rhythm, Blues Soul & Grooves
 1990 – Laquan – Notes of a Native Son
 1991 – The Don – Wake Up the Party
 1991 – Bell Biv DeVoe – WBBD-Bootcity: The Remix Album
 1991 – MC Lyte – Act Like You Know
 1992 – MC Serch – Return of the Product
 1992 – Various Artists – White Men Can't Jump
 1993 – Blood of Abraham – Future Profits
 1994 – Willy DeVille – Backstreets of Desire
 1995 – Laurent Voulzy – Voulzy Tours
 1995 – Kelley Hunt – Kelley Hunt
 1995 – Michel-Yves Kochmann – Souchon Au Bout Des Doigts
 1995 – Chris Thomas – 21st Century Blues...From da 'Hood
 1996 – Thom Rotella – How My Heart Beats
 1997 – Tommy Bolin Band – Live from Ebbets Field: May 13, 1976
 1997 – Paul Ventimiglia – Il Bacio
 1997 – B.B. King – Deuces Wild
 1998 – John Lee Hooker – The Best of Friends
 1998 – Keb' Mo' – Slow Down
 1998 – MC Solaar – Le Tour de la Question
 1999 – Marty Grebb – Smooth Sailin 1999 – Arthur Adams – Back on Track
 2000 – Keb' Mo' – The Door
 2000 – Jimmy Barnes – Soul Deeper
 2000 – Lisa Hilton – Cocktails at Eight
 2001 – Lisa Hilton – Feeling Good
 2001 – Lucky Peterson – Double Dealin'''
 2001 – Jimmy Smith – Dot Com Blues 2001 – Laurent Voulzy – Avril 2002 – Chris Spedding – One Step Ahead of the Blues 2002 – Rod Stewart – It Had To Be You: The Great American Songbook 2003 – Paul Cacia – The Opening Act 2003 – Lyle Lovett – Smile 2003 – Keb' Mo' – Martin Scorsese Presents the Blues: Keb' Mo' 2003 – Lisa Hilton – In the Mood for Jazz 2003 – Ziggy Marley – Dragonfly 2003 – Rod Stewart – As Time Goes By: The Great American Songbook, Volume II 2004 – Rod Stewart – Stardust: The Great American Songbook, Volume III 2004 – Arthur Adams – Soul of the Blues 2004 – Johnny Rivers – Reinvention Highway 2004 – Peach – Real Thing 2004 – Keb' Mo' – Peace...Back by Popular Demand 2004 – Eric Burdon – My Secret Life 2004 – Keb' Mo' – Keep It Simple 2004 – Lisa Hilton – Jazz After Hours 2005 – Star Academy 5 – Star Academy 5: Les Meilleurs Moments 2005 – Herbie Hancock – Possibilities 2005 – Lisa Hilton – My Favorite Things 2005 – Colin James – Limelight 2005 – Brian Simpson – It's All Good 2005 – Mike Costley – I Am A Singer 2005 – Reggie McBride – Element 2006 – Keb' Mo' – Suitcase 2006 – Eric Burdon – Soul of a Man 2006 – Johnny Lee Schell – Schell Game 2006 – Chris Thomas King – Rise 2006 – Lisa Hilton – Midnight in Manhattan 2006 – Steve Madaio – Midnight Rendezvous 2006 – Jimmy Barnes – JB50 2006 – Robin McKelle – Introducing Robin McKelle 2007 – Nils – Ready To Play 2007 – John Cruz – One of These Days 2007 – Ernie Halter – Congress Hotel 2007 – Lisa Hilton – After Dark 2008 – Mad Buffalo – Wilderness 2008 – Robin McKelle – Modern Antique 2008 – Dan O'Sullivan – Little Peeces 2008 – Kara Grainger – Grand and Green River 2009 – Nils – Up Close and Personal 2009 – Solomon King – Under The Sun 2009 – Jimmy Barnes – The Rhythm and the Blues 2009 – Arthur Adams – Stomp The Floor 2009 – Rod Stewart – Soulbook 2009 – Keb' Mo' – Live & Mo
 2009 – Jeffrey Osbourne – Greatest Hits Live! 2009 – Rickie Lee Jones – Balm in Gilead 2010 – Jimmy Barnes – Rage and Ruin 2010 – Playing For Change – Playing For Change Live 2010 – Mindi Abair – In Hi-Fi Stereo 2010 – Coco Montoya – I Want It All Back 2010 – Nellie McKay – Home Sweet Mobile Home 2010 – Rod Stewart – Fly Me to the Moon... The Great American Songbook Volume V 2011 – Keb' Mo' – The Reflection 2011 – Jeff Johnson – Shine 2011 – Playing For Change – PFC 2: Songs Around The World 2011 – Michael Grimm – Michael Grimm 2011 – Chris Barber – Memories of My Trip 2012 – Mitch Ryder – The Promise 2012 – Clarence Bekker – Old Soul 2012 – Nils – City Groove 2012 – Various Artists – Chimes of Freedom 2012 – Marek Niedzwiecki – Smooth Jazz Cafe 12 2012 – Billy Ray Cyrus – Change My Mind 2012 – Glenn Frey – After Hours 2013 – Marcella Detroit – The Vehicle 2013 – Eric Burdon 'Til Your River Runs Dry 2015 – Steve Tyrell – That Lovin' Feeling''

References

External links
 Official website (Note: requires Adobe Flash-Player)

1954 births
Living people
Guitarists from Detroit
20th-century American bass guitarists
American male bass guitarists
20th-century American male musicians